Evans Ashira (born 28 December 1969) is a Kenyan former professional boxer, a multi-weight world title challenger, who is best known for his loss to Joe Calzaghe in 2005, but also unsuccessfully challenged Maselino Masoe for the WBA World Middleweight Title in 2004.  He competed at the 1996 Summer Olympics in the Welterweight division, losing to Uzbekistans Nariman Ataev.

After retirement Ashira set up his own Boxing and fitness club in Hellerup, Denmark.

References

External links

sports-reference.com

1969 births
Living people
Sportspeople from Nairobi
Kenyan male boxers
Olympic boxers of Kenya
Boxers at the 1996 Summer Olympics
Welterweight boxers
Middleweight boxers